Ross Montgomery (born 16 October 1962), nicknamed The Boss, is a Scottish professional darts player who played in World Darts Federation (WDF) tournaments and as of January 14th 2022 now plays on the Professional Darts Corporation (PDC). Montgomery also played American football in his native Scotland, having spent eleven years with Glasgow Diamonds. He was forced to retire through injury and took up the game of darts instead.

Montgomery's only major success to date was winning the Zuiderduin Masters in 2010. He is a former finalist at the BDO World Trophy and WDF World Cup, and quarter-finalist at the BDO World Championship. He has represented and captained Scotland at the WDF World Cup, WDF Europe Cup, and Six Nations Cup.

Darts career
Montgomery plays in the East Kilbride & District Darts League and in the Glasgow Premier League. He is a multiple time Rutherglen / East Kilbride singles champion.

As of 2014, Montgomery has represented Scotland at four WDF World Cups, four WDF Europe Cups and six BDO Six Nations Cups. He has played in thirty-six matches for Scotland, winning twenty-four of them.

Montgomery qualified for the 2006 BDO World Championships along with players like Brian Woods and eventual champion Jelle Klaasen of the Netherlands. Montgomery was drawn in the first round with another Dutchman Vincent van der Voort, losing 3–1 in sets.

He followed this, however, by reaching the final of the Scottish Open, beating Gary Robson and Michael van Gerwen before losing in the final to Sweden's Göran Klemme, runner-up in the 2005 World Masters. He played in the 2007 International Darts League, beating PDC player Chris Mason, Belgium's Dirk Hespeels and avenged his Lakeside defeat by van der Voort to win Group 4 with a 100% record. He wasn't able to repeat his performances in the Last 32 Group stage, losing all 3 of his games in Group D to Martin Atkins, Scott Waites and group winner Raymond van Barneveld. Montgomery produced a good run in the Winmau World Masters, reaching the last 16 of the tournament, losing to Atkins.

In 2008, Montgomery won the newly created EDO England Open, which was run by the newly formed English Darts Organisation. He scored wins over Johnny Nijs, Ted Hankey, Gary Robson and Edwin Max before beating another Scotsman Gary Anderson in the final. He then reached the final of the inaugural BDO International Open, an event formerly known as the BDO England Open, losing to Davy Richardson. On 26 July 2008 Montgomery won his second event of the year, winning the British Classic, again beating Anderson in the final. Montgomery regained the British Classic crown in 2010, defeating Stuart Kellett in the final. Montgomery ended 2008 ranked seventh on the year end WDF World rankings.

These performances helped Montgomery earn automatic qualification for the 2009 BDO World Championships as the number 10 seed. He defeated Welshman Martin Phillips in the first round but lost in round two to eventual champion Ted Hankey. He entered the tournament the following year as the Number 6 seed, but wasted six darts to win his first round match and lost to Garry Thompson.

Montgomery won the 2010 British Classic as well as the 2010 Zuiderduin Masters, his inaugural major title, where he came from 4–0 down in sets to win 5–4 against Robbie Green, also surviving three match darts. Montgomery finished as the year end number one in WDF Working Rankings Europe for 2010. At the 2011 BDO World Darts Championship, Montgomery was beaten 3–1 in sets by Alan Norris.

Montgomery reached the semi-finals of the 2011 Winmau World Masters where he was beaten in a deciding leg by Dean Winstanley. Following his victory at 2010 edition, Montgomery had another decent run reaching the semi-finals of the Zuiderduin Masters in 2011. At the 2012 BDO World Darts Championship, Montgomery reached the second round for only the second time courtesy of a 3–1 win over Fabian Roosenbrand in the first round, but was subsequently defeated 4–1 by eventual runner-up Tony O'Shea.

Montgomery was defeated in the first round of the 2013 BDO World Darts Championship 3–1 by Paul Jennings, having had four darts to lead 2–1. Montgomery captained Scotland to silver behind England in the overall team competition at the 2013 WDF World Cup, while alongside team-mates Gary Stone, Craig Baxter and Alan Soutar, Scotland defeated America 9–7 in the men's team final. Montgomery again reached the semi-finals of the Zuiderduin Masters, losing to eventual champion James Wilson.

He followed this with a narrow 3–2 first round win at the 2014 World Championship over qualifier Michael Meaney, after Meaney missed seven darts to take a 2–0 lead in the deciding set. He was beaten in the second round by Martin Adams. Montgomery showed good form to lift the Dutch Open with victory over Scott Waites and then reach the final of the newly reinstated BDO World Trophy, where he was defeated 13–11 by James Wilson.

At the 2015 World Championship, Monty defeated Pip Blackwell 3–1 in the first round, before dispatching Scott Waites 4–0 in the second to reach the quarter finals at Lakeside for the first time in his career. He was then beaten 5–1 in the quarter finals by Martin Adams.

After a quiet year on the circuit, Montgomery still managed to qualify for the 2016 World Championship but was unseeded for the first time in 10 years, He lost in the first round to Jamie Hughes 3–0.

PDC
He announced on the 6th January his intention to participate in the 2022 PDC Q School for the first time ever. And on the third day of competition he out right won a tour card and will now play for first time ever on the PDC circuit in 2022 and 2023.

Personal life
While Montgomery played American football for the Glasgow Diamonds he met his wife Dorothy, who was a cheerleader for the team at the time. He and his wife Dorothy have a son Scott (born 1993) and daughters Alisha (born 1998) and Gemma (born 2000).

Montgomery is a supporter of football club Glasgow Rangers.

World Championship results

BDO
 2006: First round (lost to Vincent van der Voort 1–3)
 2009: Second round (lost to Ted Hankey 1–4)
 2010: First round (lost to Garry Thompson 2–3)
 2011: First round (lost to Alan Norris 1–3)
 2012: Second round (lost to Tony O'Shea 1–4)
 2013: First round (lost to Paul Jennings 1–3)
 2014: Second round (lost to Martin Adams 1–4)
 2015: Quarter-finals (lost to Martin Adams 1–5)
 2016: First round (lost to Jamie Hughes 0–3)
 2017: First round (lost to Richard Veenstra 1–3)
 2018: First round (lost to Scott Waites 1–3)
 2019: First round (lost to Scott Baker 0–3)
 2020: Preliminary round (lost to Thibault Tricole 2–3)

Career finals

BDO major finals (1 title, 1 runner-up)

WDF major finals (1 runner-up)

Performance timeline

PDC European Tour

References

External links
Ross Montgomery's profile and stats on Darts Database

1962 births
Living people
Scottish darts players
Place of birth missing (living people)
British Darts Organisation players
Professional Darts Corporation current tour card holders